"All I Need" is the debut single by Jesse Powell, released in 1996 from his eponymous debut album. The song was written by Powell, Sam Salter and Laney Stewart; and was produced by Stewart. It peaked at No. 25 on the Billboard R&B chart in 1996.

Chart performance

References

External links
 
 

1995 songs
1996 debut singles
Jesse Powell songs
Silas Records singles
Song recordings produced by Laney Stewart
Songs written by Jesse Powell
Songs written by Sam Salter
Songs written by Laney Stewart